Slapping and popping are ways to produce percussive sounds on a stringed instrument. It is primarily used on the double bass or bass guitar. Slapping on bass guitar involves using the edge of one's knuckle, where it is particularly bony, to quickly strike the string against the fretboard. On bass guitars, this is commonly done with the thumb, while on double bass, the edge of the hand or index finger may be used. Popping refers to pulling the string away from the fretboard and quickly releasing it so it snaps back against the fretboard. On bass guitar, the two techniques are commonly used together in alternation, though either may be used separately.

Overview
On the double bass, the technique was developed by jazz bands in New Orleans in the early 1900s, and later spread to other genres, including western swing, rockabilly, and other offshoots of those styles.  On the bass guitar, the technique is widely credited to Larry Graham, an electric bassist playing with Sly and the Family Stone in the late 1960s.  The technique quickly spread to the funk and disco genres.

Slapping is a technique also adopted by acoustic and electric fingerstyle guitarists. John Lennon is seen slapping his guitar in the first two measures of the song "Get Back" in Peter Jackson's documentary "The Beatles: Get Back".

Double bass

On double bass it refers to the technique that is a more vigorous version of pizzicato, where the string is plucked so hard that when released it bounces off the finger board, making a distinctive sound. A percussive sound can also be made by smacking the strings with some or all of the fingers on the right hand in between the notes of a bassline, usually in time with the snare drum.

The earliest players of this technique in American music include Bill Johnson (1872–1972), Theodore "Steve" Brown (1890–1965), Wellman Braud (1891–1966), Pops Foster (1892–1969), and Chester Zardis (1900–1990).

Slap bass was used by Western Swing and Hillbilly Boogie musicians. It became an important component of an early form of rock and roll that combined blues and what was then called hillbilly music—a musical style now referred to as rockabilly. Bill Black, who played with Elvis Presley and Scotty Moore was a well-known slap bass player. The technique inspired the George and Ira Gershwin song "Slap That Bass".

Slap bass continues to be used in the 21st century, as it is widely used by modern rockabilly and psychobilly band bassists, including Kim Nekroman (Nekromantix), Geoff Kresge (Tiger Army), Scott Owen (The Living End) and Jimbo Wallace (The Reverend Horton Heat). Kresge's rapid slapping ability is all the more remarkable given that for much of his career he was an electric bassist. The top rockabilly and psychobilly bassists have developed the ability to perform rapid triplet slaps at the same time as they play a walking bassline.

Bass guitar

On bass guitar, slapping usually refers to a percussive playing technique most commonly used in funk, disco, soul, R&B, jazz, country music, rock, and many other genres. The style sounds much more percussive than regular plucking of notes with the soft part of the plucking hands fingers, and is also usually louder (although on an electric instrument, the volume can be adjusted with the volume knob or through compression), brighter, and more distinct than the sound of a bass guitar played with the usual plucking or pick techniques.

The slap sound comes from the combination of two elements: slapping, which involves striking the string with the side of the bony joint in the middle of the thumb, a harder surface than the pads of the fingers (used in plucked fingering); and intentionally allowing the vibrating string to come into contact with the metal frets, producing a "toney" or buzzing sound that is normally avoided in plucked/fingered bass.

In the slap technique, the bassist replaces the usual plucking motion of the index and middle fingers with "slaps" and "pops". In the slap, the bassist uses the thumb to strike the strings (usually the lower E and A strings) near the base of the bass's neck. In the pop, the bassist will use the index or middle finger of the plucking hand to snap the strings (usually the higher D and G strings) away from the body of the bass, causing them to bounce off the fretboard; this produces a prominent buzzing tone with a sharp attack and more high-frequency vibrations than present in plucked bass.

The bassist can play many notes quickly by rotating the forearm, alternately slapping and popping: during the pop, the hand moves away from the fretboard, "winding up" or getting in position for the next slap. The slap and pop techniques are commonly used with pull-offs and hammer-ons with the fretting (usually left) hand, to further increase the rate at which notes may be played. Ghost notes, or notes played with the string damped, are also commonly played in slap bass to increase the percussive feel of the technique.

The invention of slap on electric bass is generally credited to funk bassist Larry Graham. Graham has stated in several interviews that he was trying to emulate the sound of a drum set before his band had found its drummer. Graham himself refers to the technique as "thumpin′ and pluckin′".

Selected slap bass players

Some prominent electric bass players known for their use of slapping in their playing include:

 Mark Adams (funk band, Slave,"Slide",1978
 James Alexander (The Bar-Kays), "Shut The Funk Up", 1977
 Bootsy Collins (solo artist; Bootsy's Rubber Band, Funkadelic, Parliament, Praxis)
Marvin Craig (Lakeside),"Fantastic Voyage", 1981
 Nathan East (Fourplay, Daft Punk)
 Bernard Edwards (Chic)
 Jerry Barnes (Chic) 
 Jake Erwins The Hot Club of Cowtown (Jake Erwin)
 Flea (Red Hot Chili Peppers)
 Johnny Flippins (Fatback Band)
 Derek Forbes (Simple Minds and Propaganda)
 Mike Gordon (Phish)
 Davide Roccamo (Blue Cold Ice Creams)
 Billy Gould (Faith No More)
 Les Claypool (Primus)
 Larry Graham (Sly and the Family Stone, Graham Central Station), credited with inventing the technique for electric bass. Sly and the Family Stone "Thank You" (1970)
 Louis Johnson (The Brothers Johnson, Quincy Jones, Michael Jackson)
 Mark King (Level 42)
 Tony Levin (King Crimson, Peter Gabriel, Stick Men)
 Kevin McCord (Funk band, One Way), "One of Us", 1982
 Marcus Miller (solo artist, Miles Davis, David Sanborn, Luther Vandross)
 Lee Rocker (Stray Cats)
 Robert Trujillo (Metallica, Suicidal Tendencies)
 Doug Wimbish (Sugarhill Gang, Grandmaster Flash, Living Colour, Mick Jagger)
 Victor Wooten (Béla Fleck and the Flecktones)
 Ryan Martinie (Mudvayne)
Doug Rauch (Giants, "Attitude" 1970. Also; Santana, Betty Davis, Lenny White, Billy Cobham) pioneer of "double" thumb technique
Jamie Stewart (The Cult)
Davie504, a YouTube bassist and comedian
Rob Scallon, a YouTube guitarist and bassist
Reginald "Fieldy" Arvizu (Korn)

Variants

There are numerous variants of the slapping technique. Some bassists use other fingers of the strumming hand to achieve this sound, such as bassist Abraham Laboriel, Sr., who uses his thumb to pop the strings, and his other four fingers to slap the strings. Bassist Victor Wooten uses a double thump technique which is like a slap, but uses both sides of the thumb for all the strings, fast enough to produce the equivalent of a drumroll on the bass guitar.

Funk fingers invented by progressive rock bass player Tony Levin create a similar sound by using a hard surface to strike the strings and intentionally cause string contact with the fretboard. Spank bass developed from the slap and pop style and treats the electric bass as a percussion instrument, striking the strings above the pickups with an open palmed hand.

The slap technique bears some resemblance to tambour, a percussive technique used in flamenco and classical guitar, although the tonal quality produced in this technique is quite different from that of a slapped electric bass. Japanese musician Miyavi is well known for creating a unique slapping style of playing electric guitars. Tosin Abasi, guitarist for progressive metal band Animals as Leaders, is also known for a slapping and popping technique on electric guitar, which he uses for both melodic and percussive effect.

Use in popular culture

 The theme song for the television sitcom Seinfeld uses slap bass keyboard samples. A sample was also played in between scenes in each episode, often punctuating a scene or highlighting a punchline.
 The slap bass technique is used for the instrumental for theme song of the Nickelodeon show Kenan and Kel.
 The 2008 film Forgetting Sarah Marshall parodies Seinfeld's usage when the main character Peter (played by Jason Segel), who produces music for a TV series, inserts a goofy slap bass sample into a dramatic scene where "dark and ominous" music was needed.
 The original 1987-94 run of the Welsh children's series Fireman Sam uses slap bass in the theme song.
 Kylie Minogue's billboard #3 hit "The Locomotion" features slap bass.
 In television sitcom Everybody Hates Chris, a slap bass sample of Marcus Miller is used in between scenes in each episode, often punctuating a scene or highlighting a punchline.
 The theme song for the television sitcom ALF features a slap bass.
 In the popular British series The Mighty Boosh, the recurring character "The Hitcher" uses his large thumb for playing slap bass.
 The 1990s sitcom Martin features slap bass riffs as well as many sitcoms of that period with soul, funk-oriented theme songs.
 A joke in the 2009 film I Love You, Man is the main character's enthusiasm for "slappin da bass".
'I Could Be So Good for You', by Dennis Waterman and the theme tune for the British television series 'Minder' features slap bass.

References

External links

 Slap Bass Audio & Video Samples from FunkyChops
 Free Examples with Audio and TAB from Slap It!
 Free Slap Bass Video Tutorial
 Slap Lessons from BerkleeShares
 Music Man Stingray audio and photo
 How To Slap Bass Beginners Guide

Musical performance techniques
Bass guitars
Double basses